Sukanya Cholasuek (born 1931), writing under the pen name Krisna Asoksin, is a Thai novelist. She has written about 150 novels and many other short stories. Her 1980 novel Poon Pid Thong won the S.E.A. Write Award in 1985, and she was named National Artist in literature in 1988. Most of her early work has been described as "domestic drama", while her more recent output has taken on social and political themes. Many of her novels have been adapted as well-known Thai television soap operas, each with multiple remakes, including Namphueng Khom, Mia Luang and Sawan Biang.

Bibliography
 Klin fāng, 1993
 Pūn pit thō̜ng , 1982 (translated as Poon Pid Thong: Gold-pasted Cement, 2014)
 Mīa lūang, 1969
 Rāk kǣo, 1971
 Bān khonnok, 1979
 Butsabok baimāi, 1982
 Sīang nok čhāk phrāk, 1986
 Thān kao fai mai, 1989

Notes

References

Krisna Asoksin
Krisna Asoksin
Krisna Asoksin
Krisna Asoksin
S.E.A. Write Award winners
Pseudonymous women writers
20th-century pseudonymous writers
1931 births
Living people